Hashem Heydari  is an Iranian football midfielder who played for Iran and Esteghlal FC.

References

External links
 

Iran international footballers
Iranian footballers
Esteghlal F.C. players
Rah Ahan players
1966 births
Living people
Bahman players
Association football midfielders